Glove Taps is a 1937 Our Gang short comedy film directed by Gordon Douglas. It was the 151st Our Gang short (152nd episode, 63rd talking short, and 64th talking episode) that was released.

Plot
Butch explains that he clobbers every kid in school to prove that he is in charge. By a fluke, weak-kneed Alfalfa is chosen to face Butch in the barnyard boxing ring—and he has only one day to train for the big bout.

Spanky volunteers to be Alfalfa's trainer, which consists mostly of Alfalfa pulling him around in a little red wagon.

Porky and Buckwheat have had "this will not end well" expressions on their faces the whole time. They take matters into their own hands once the bout starts; knocking Butch out from behind a curtain and allowing Alfalfa to take the credit.

Notes
After appearing as a peripheral player in several earlier Our Gang shorts, Tommy Bond made a spectacular return to the series in Glove Taps. Here and in all future appearances, Bond is cast as neighborhood bully Butch, the bane of the existence of Spanky McFarland, Carl "Alfalfa" Switzer and the rest of the Gang.
Another Our Ganger debuts as Glove Taps Marks the first appearance of Darwood Kaye.
The background music in this one-reel comedy came from Marvin Hatley's Oscar-nominated score for the Laurel and Hardy feature Way Out West.

Cast

The Gang
 Eugene Lee as Porky
 George McFarland as Spanky
 Carl Switzer as Alfalfa
 Billie Thomas as Buckwheat

Additional cast
 Tommy Bond as Butch
 Sidney Kibrick as Woim
 Darla Hood as Darla
 Darwood Kaye as Waldo

Extra kids
Hugh Chapman, John Collum, Rex Downing, Larry Harris, Joe Levine, Jackie Lindquist, Donald Proffitt, Hugh Sheridan, Harold Switzer, Jerry Tucker, Bobs Watson, Robert Winkler

See also
 Our Gang filmography

References

External links

1937 films
1937 comedy films
American black-and-white films
Films directed by Gordon Douglas
Hal Roach Studios short films
Our Gang films
1937 short films
1930s American films